The 2019 TicketGuardian 500 was a Monster Energy NASCAR Cup Series race that was held on March 10, 2019, at ISM Raceway in Avondale, Arizona. Contested over 312 laps on the  oval, it was the fourth race of the 2019 Monster Energy NASCAR Cup Series season.

Report

Background

ISM Raceway, is a one-mile, low-banked tri-oval race track located in Avondale, Arizona. The motorsport track opened in 1964 and currently hosts two NASCAR race weekends annually. PIR has also hosted the IndyCar Series, CART, USAC and the Rolex Sports Car Series. The raceway is currently owned and operated by International Speedway Corporation.

Entry list

First practice

Qualifying

Qualifying results

Practice (post-qualifying)

Second practice

Final practice

Race

Stage Results

Stage One
Laps: 75

During pre-race ceremonies, the Luke Air Force Base presented the nation's colors. Pastor Rick Derbyshire would give out the invocation.16-year old Chevel Shepherd, who had won Season 15 of The Voice, would sing the national anthem. The son of the CEO of TicketGuardian. Hudson Derbyshire, accompanied by his father and CEO, Brian and his mom, gave out the starting command. 

At the race start, NASCAR judged that Chase Elliott jumped the restart against Ryan Blaney, and Elliott, while leading the first couple of laps, had to make a pass through penalty on pit road. Ryan Blaney would lead the first 35 laps before being passed by Kyle Busch on lap 36. Three laps later, Erik Jones would suffer a flat tire and spin in Turn 2, causing the first caution of the day. After cycling through pit stops, Denny Hamlin would lead the field to green on lap 46, before being passed for the lead by Busch just a lap later. Busch would lead until lap 65, when Brad Keselowski also suffering a flat tire and hitting the Turn 2 wall, almost collecting Ryan Preece. After more pit stops, Ryan Blaney would restart in the lead  on lap 71 and would hang on to win the first stage. 

Stage Two
Laps: 75

The field restarted on lap 84, with Kyle Busch leading the field to green. Busch, starting from lap 80 would go on to lead the next 73 laps. Alex Bowman would suffer a flat tire with just three laps to go in the stage, hitting the turn 1 wall. Kyle Busch would win the stage under caution.

Final Stage Results

Stage Three
Laps: 162

Kyle Busch would jump to the lead on the initial restart, but a lap later Michael McDowell after missing the exit of the turn 2 wall, got hit in the rear by David Ragan and hit the wall. His car would not steer and would then hit the turn 3 wall, causing McDowell to retire. Kyle Busch would once again lead the field to the restart on lap 166, and would stay in the lead until lap 195, when Alex Bowman had another flat tire and pounded the turn 3 wall. Alex Bowman would retire from the race. Busch restarted and held on to the lead until lap 219, when Elliott spun off of turn 4. Hemric would take the lead after pit stops cycled, and restarted in first. However, on the first lap of the restart, Preece would hit the wall and clip the right front end of Daniel Suarez's car, sending Preece into the inside backstretch wall. Blaney would take the lead again, however Preece would again cause another caution, causing him to retire. Almirola would restart and take the lead until lap 251 when Blaney took the lead. Blaney held on to the lead until Busch, after a few laps battling took the lead on lap 296. Busch would pull away from Blaney and win.

Race statistics
 Lead changes: 17 among 6 different drivers
 Cautions/Laps: 9 for 57
 Red flags: 0
 Time of race: 3 hours, 4 minutes and 5 seconds
 Average speed:

Media

Television
Fox Sports covered their 15th race at the ISM Raceway. Mike Joy, two-time Phoenix winner Jeff Gordon and Darrell Waltrip called the race from the broadcast booth. Jamie Little, Vince Welch and Matt Yocum handled the pit road duties for the television side.

Radio
MRN covered the radio action for the race which was also simulcasted on Sirius XM NASCAR Radio.

Standings after the race

Drivers' Championship standings

Manufacturers' Championship standings

Note: Only the first 16 positions are included for the driver standings.

References

2019 in sports in Arizona
2019 Monster Energy NASCAR Cup Series
March 2019 sports events in the United States
NASCAR races at Phoenix Raceway